Phulpur is a constituency of the Uttar Pradesh Legislative Assembly covering the city of Phulpur in the Prayagraj district of Uttar Pradesh, India.

Phulpur is one of five assembly constituencies in the Phulpur Lok Sabha constituency. Since 2008, this assembly constituency is numbered 256 amongst 403 constituencies.

Members of Vidhan Sabha

Election results

2022

2017
Bharatiya Janta Party candidate Praveen Kumar Singh won in 2017 Uttar Pradesh Legislative Elections defeating Samajwadi Party candidate Mansoor Alam by a margin of 26,613 votes.

2012 Vidhan Sabha
 Sayeed Ahamad (SP) : 72,898 votes  
 Praveen Patel (BSP) : 64,998

1977 Vidhan Sabha
 Padmakar (JNP) : 27,238 votes  
 Abul Kalam (INC) : 19,317

1962 Vidhan Sabha
 Muzaffar Hasan (INC) : 21,560 votes 
 Amar Singh (Jana Sangh) : 7,232

References

External links
 

Assembly constituencies of Uttar Pradesh
Politics of Allahabad district